Northern (Arctic) Federal University named after M.V. Lomonosov, or NArFU for short, is a Federal University established in Arkhangelsk pursuant to Russian Federation President Dmitry Medvedev’s Decree dd. 8 June 2010 on the basis of Arkhangelsk State Technical University (ASTU).

History of establishment 
NArFU was set up on the basis of Arkhangelsk State Technical University (ASTU). 
The rector of the university is Elena V. Kudryashova, professor, PhD.
On 12 July 2011, the university was restructured through merger with state-owned high and vocational schools – M.V. Lomonosov Pomor State University, Emperor Peter I Forestry Engineering College in Arkhangelsk, Severodvinsk Technical College – and renamed into M.V. Lomonosov Northern (Arctic) Federal University. The university bears the name of the 18th century polymath Mikhail Lomonosov, born in the Arkhangelsk region.

Organization  
NArFU incorporates 7 Higher schools and 2 campuses based in Severodvinsk and Koryazhma
 Higher School of Social Sciences, Humanities and International Communication 
 Higher School of Natural Sciences and Technologies 
 Higher School of Information Technologies and Automated Systems 
 Higher School of Economics, Management and Law 
 Higher School of Engineering 
 Higher School of Power Engineering, Oil and Gas
Education in Higher School of Energy, Oil and Gas is focused on anticipatory training of high specialists (bachelors, masters and PhD) with a full range of innovative knowledge and practical skills demanded by the Russian energy, oil and gas companies.  
Higher school includes training, research and engineering facilities provided by the specialized laboratory equipment.  
High educational and scientific potential is achieved with the help of teaching, research, modeling methods and development of deposits of different geological nature.   
 Higher School of Psychology and Pedagogical Education
Higher School of Psychology and Pedagogical Education was established in 2016 on the basis of two institutes: Institute of Pedagogy and Psychology and  Institute of Physical Education, Sport and Health. 
Both institutes were successors of Pomor State University, its departments and faculties: Department of Pedagogy, Faculty of Special Education, Faculty of Pedagogy of Primary Education and Social Pedagogy, Faculty of Psychology, Faculty of Physical Education.  
 Institute of Shipbuilding and Maritime Arctic Engineering (former Sevmashvtuz (Sevmash Technical College))
 Institute of Humanities (branch in Severodvinsk)
 Technical College (branch in Severodvinsk)
 Koryazhma Branch
 Technological College of Emperor Peter I

Colleges 
 The University Colleges include College of Telecommunications and Information Technologies
 Severodvinsk Technical College
 Emperor Peter I Forestry Engineering College in Arkhangelsk.

Academic year 
The university's academic year is divided into two semesters. The first semester normally runs from September to December, the second – from February to June, with breaks in the early January for Christmas holidays and summer holiday running throughout July and August.

Branches and other institutions 
NArFU branches are located in Severodvinsk and Koryazhma. Two more are to be opened in Kotlas and Nenets Autonomous District. Among the university's infrastructural elements are several technology centers – Shared-Use Equipment Center "Arktika", Innovative Technological Center "Arctic Oil and Gas Laboratory Research", Arctic Remote Sensing Center, Forest Monitoring Center. The university plans to open the Innovative Technological Center "Modern Technologies to Process Northern Bioresources" and the patents and intellectual property protection office.

Sport 
The university has signed a cooperation agreement with Russian Bandy Federation.

References

Universities in Russia
Buildings and structures in Arkhangelsk
Arkhangelsk
Federal universities of Russia